The North Fork San Gabriel River is a tributary,  long, of the West Fork San Gabriel River in the Angeles National Forest of Los Angeles County, California. The river originates at the confluence of Soldier Creek and Coldbrook Creek in the San Gabriel Mountains below the village of Falling Springs and flows down a steep canyon in a southerly direction to join the West Fork near San Gabriel Reservoir. The North Fork Canyon provides the route for SR 39, one of the main access roads to the Angeles Forest.

The area has campsites, trails and picnic areas and is one of the more popular sites in the Angeles National Forest.

See also
List of rivers of California

References

Rivers of Los Angeles County, California